"Such a Night" is a popular song from 1953, written by Lincoln Chase and first recorded by the Drifters.

The Drifters featuring Clyde McPhatter recorded the song in November 1953, and Atlantic Records released it in January 1954 as the intended B-side of the McPhatter-penned "Lucille", which was recorded by an earlier version of the group. Despite being banned by some radio stations as too "racy", it reached number 2 on the American [[Hot R&B/Hip-Hop Songs|R&B chart in 1954.

Other versions
The song also became a hit single for Johnnie Ray, whose cover version reached No. 1 in the UK Singles Chart in 1954. Ray's version entered the US Cash Box chart on 27 March 1954, peaking at No. 18 two weeks later on 10 April.
Elvis Presley also recorded the song and released it on his 1960 RCA Victor album Elvis Is Back!. Presley's version made number 13 in the UK and number 16 in the US, when released as a single in 1964. 
 Flemish singer Eric De Clerk took the artist name 'Ricky Gordon', performed Dutch schlager songs, but changed to rock and roll in 1974, and "Such A Night" became his first hit: a Top 10 hit in both Flanders and the Netherlands.

References

Songs about nights
1954 singles
1953 songs
UK Singles Chart number-one singles
Atlantic Records singles
Songs written by Lincoln Chase
Johnnie Ray songs
Elvis Presley songs